Annika Walter (born 5 February 1975) is a retired German diver.  Walter won a silver medal in 10m platforming diving at the 1996 Summer Olympic Games.

References

Olympic divers of Germany
Living people
Olympic medalists in diving
German female divers
1975 births
Olympic silver medalists for Germany
Divers at the 1996 Summer Olympics
Medalists at the 1996 Summer Olympics